The 1937 Cork Senior Football Championship was the 49th staging of the Cork Senior Football Championship since its establishment by the Cork County Board in 1887. 

Duhallow West entered the championship as the defending champions.

On 12 September 1937, Carbery won the championship following a 3-08 to 1-01 defeat of Duhallow West in the final at the Cork Athletic Grounds. This was their first championship title.

Results

Final

Miscellaneous
 Carbery win their first title.
 The final between Carbery and Duhallow West is the first all divisional final.

References

Cork Senior Football Championship